The 1978 Gent–Wevelgem was the 40th edition of the Gent–Wevelgem cycle race and was held on 12 April 1978. The race started in Ghent and finished in Wevelgem. The race was won by Ferdi Van Den Haute of the Marc team.

General classification

References

Gent–Wevelgem
1978 in road cycling
1978 in Belgian sport